The 2009 Liga Indonesia Premier Division Final was a football match which was played on 29 May 2009. Persisam and Persema was a debutant of the final stage.

Road to Samarinda

Match details

See also
2008–09 Liga Indonesia Premier Division

References

External links
Liga Indonesia Premier Division standings

2008-09